Antônio Bivar Battistetti Lima (25 April 1939 – 5 July 2020), better known simply as Antônio Bivar, was a Brazilian writer of the Beat Generation and playwright.

Life
Born in São Paulo in 1939, Bivar moved to Ribeirão Preto in his teens and later worked as office assistant and office boy.

At the age of 21 he joined the Conservatório Nacional de Teatro in Rio de Janeiro, where he studied Performing arts.

In 1968, his plays Cordélia Brasil and Abre a janela e deixa entrar o ar puro e o sol da manhã both helped him win the Molière Award for best Playwright.

Between 1970 and 1972, Bivar spent most of his time traveling overseas due to his deteriorating relationship with the Brazilian military government. During his trips he saw the birth of the Punk subculture in London and became fascinated with the movement.

In the 1980s, Bivar started writing books. His favorite genres were biography and memoir and his favorite subjects were theatre, punk culture and the beatnik movement.

In 1982, Bivar organized O Começo do Fim do Mundo, Brazil's first punk festival which was held in his native São Paulo.

Death
On 5 July 2020, Bivar died in São Paulo at the age of 81 due to complications brought on by COVID-19 during the COVID-19 pandemic in Brazil.

Bibliography
 Simone de Beauvoir, pare de fumar, siga o exemplo de Gildinha Saraiva e comece a trabalhar, play, 1964
 Cordélia Brasil, play, 1967
 Abre a janela e deixa entrar o ar puro e o sol da manhã, play, 1968
 O cão siamês, play, 1969
 A passagem da rainha, play, 1969
 Longe daqui, aqui mesmo, play, 1971
 Alzira Power, play, 1973
 Gente fina é outra coisa, play, 1976
 Quarteto, play, 1976
 O que é punk, 1982
 A passagem da rainha, play, 1984
 James Dean, biography, 1984
 Verdes vales do fim do mundo, memoir, 1985
 Alice, que delícia!, play, 1987
 Chic-a-boom, 1991
 Longe daqui, aqui mesmo, memoir/travel, 1995
 A três primeiras peças, 2002
 Yolanda, biography, 2004
 Jack Kerouac: o rei dos beatniks, biography, 2005
 Bivar na corte de Bloomsbury, 2005
 Histórias do Brasil Para Teatro, 2007
 Contos atrevidos, 2009
 O Teatro de Antônio Bivar/As Três Primeiras peças, 2010
 Mundo adentro vida afora, memoir, 2014
 Aos quatro ventos, biography, 2016
 Punk, 2018
 Perseverança, 2019

References 

1939 births
2020 deaths
20th-century Brazilian male writers
20th-century Brazilian dramatists and playwrights
21st-century Brazilian male writers
21st-century Brazilian dramatists and playwrights
Brazilian male dramatists and playwrights
Writers from São Paulo
Deaths from the COVID-19 pandemic in São Paulo (state)